Frederic Rich may refer to:

 Frederic C. Rich (fl. 1980s–2010s), American author, lawyer, and environmentalist
 Fred Rich (1898–1956), Polish-American bandleader and composer

See also
Frederick Henry Rich (1824–1904), British soldier